Giuseppe Gobetti (born May 6, 1909 in Turin) was an Italian professional football player.

References
 Career summary by playerhistory.com

1909 births
Year of death missing
Italian footballers
Serie A players
Juventus F.C. players
Cagliari Calcio players
Association football midfielders